The men's shot put at the 2022 World Athletics U20 Championships was held at Estadio Olímpico Pascual Guerrero on 1 and 2 August.

Records

Results

Qualification
The qualification round took place on 2 August, in two groups, both starting at 10:20 Athletes attaining a mark of at least 19.60 metres ( Q ) or at least the 12 best performers ( q ) qualified for the final.

Final
The final was held on 2 August at 17:16.

References

shot put
Shot put at the World Athletics U20 Championships